Arziani is a Georgian surname. Notable people with the surname include:

 Malkhaz Arziani (1964–2022), Georgian footballer
 Zurab Arziani (born 1987), Georgian footballer, son of Malkhaz

Georgian-language surnames